Acleris ptychogrammos is a species of moth of the family Tortricidae. It is found in North America, where it has been recorded from Alabama, British Columbia, Illinois, Indiana, Kentucky, Maine, Manitoba, Maryland, Massachusetts, Michigan, Mississippi, New Hampshire, New York, North Carolina, Ohio, Oklahoma, Ontario, West Virginia and Wisconsin.

The wingspan is about 15 mm. The ground colour of the forewings is light grey with a moderately distinct red-brown costal triangle, a small black basal dash below the costa and fine black lines along the cubital and anal veins and along the inner edge of the costal triangle. Adults have been recorded on wing nearly year round in the south.

The larvae feed on Cornus sericea.

References

Moths described in 1875
ptychogrammos
Moths of North America